Route 394 or Highway 394 may refer to:

Canada
Manitoba Provincial Road 394
Saskatchewan Highway 394

Japan
 Japan National Route 394

United States
  Interstate 394
 Interstate 394 (Illinois) (possible future designation for Illinois Route 394)
  Arkansas Highway 394
  Colorado State Highway 394
  Illinois Route 394
  Iowa Highway 394 (former)
  Maryland Route 394 (former)
 New York:
  New York State Route 394
  County Route 394 (Erie County, New York)
  Pennsylvania Route 394
  Puerto Rico Highway 394
  Tennessee State Route 394
  Virginia State Route 394